Natalie Bancroft (b. circa 1980) is a member of the board of directors of News Corporation.

Biography
She is a member of the Bancroft family, which controlled the Dow Jones media empire for decades. She studied journalism, and graduated from the Institut de Ribaupierre in Lausanne, Switzerland. She is also a professionally trained opera singer.

She was appointed to the board of News Corporation at the age of 27, following News Corporation's acquisition of Dow Jones. She lives in New York.

References

1980s births
Living people
News Corporation people
Dow Jones & Company